"Delirious" is a house song performed by French DJ David Guetta and Tara McDonald (McDonald also co wrote the song) for Guetta's third studio album, Pop Life.  The song was released as the album's fourth single on January 31, 2008. Several remixes of the song, including mixes by Fred Rister, Marc Mysterio, Laidback Luke, and Arno Cost and Norman Doray were released.

Music video 
A video clip for the song was filmed by Denys Thibaut in Montreal, featuring David Guetta and Tara McDonald, picturing an executive assistant (Kelly Thiebaud) throwing paint all over her boss's office. This is the first time that a "featuring" singer has appeared in a David Guetta music video.

Track listing
 French CD single
 "Delirious" (radio edit) – 3:01
 "Delirious" (Laidback Luke Remix) – 8:09
 "Delirious" (Original Extended Mix) – 7:54

 European CD single
 "Delirious" (original extended mix) – 7:54
 "Delirious" (Laidback Luke Remix) – 8:09
 "Delirious" (Arno Cost & Norman Doray Remix) – 8:09
 "Delirious" (Fred Rister Remix) – 7:35
 "Delirious" (Radio Edit) – 3:01

Charts

Weekly charts

Year-end charts

Notes

2007 songs
2008 singles
David Guetta songs
Tara McDonald songs
Songs written by David Guetta
Songs written by Joachim Garraud
Songs written by Tara McDonald
Songs written by Carl Ryden
Virgin Records singles
EMI Records singles
Song recordings produced by David Guetta